Weldon Santos de Andrade (born 6 August 1980), known simply as Weldon, is a Brazilian professional footballer who plays for Clube Atlético Juventus as a striker.

Club career
Weldon was born in Santo André, São Paulo. In his early career, he represented four clubs in quick succession: Santos FC, Brasiliense Futebol Clube, Sport Club do Recife and Associação Atlética Ponte Preta, before moving abroad in 2004 with Al-Nassr FC of Saudi Arabia.

In the following year, Weldon signed for Cruzeiro Esporte Clube. He went on to be loaned several times for the duration of his contract, including twice in the French Ligue 1, with FC Sochaux-Montbéliard and Troyes AC, where the player was rarely used – only ten games and one goal in two season halves combined.

After an aborted move to Botafogo de Futebol e Regatas, Weldon agreed to a two-year deal at S.L. Benfica of Portugal (he had already played in the country the previous year, with C.F. Os Belenenses) on 22 July 2009. He made his official debut on 16 August, rescuing a point at home against C.S. Marítimo for the season's opener (1–1); during the team's victorious campaign he served almost exclusively as backup to Óscar Cardozo and Javier Saviola, but made the most of his minutes, for instance scoring twice in a 4–2 win at Associação Naval 1º de Maio on 5 April 2010 and adding another brace in another away triumph (3–2 against Académica de Coimbra).

Weldon only appeared in eight official matches in 2010–11, four in the league, totalling less than 100 minutes overall. In the following years he played in Romania and China, returning to his homeland at the age of 33 and continuing his career mainly in the lower leagues and amateur football; this was interspersed with a spell in the Portuguese Segunda Liga, with S.C. Olhanense.

Honours
Sport
Campeonato Pernambucano: 2003, 2007

Benfica
Primeira Liga: 2009–10
Taça da Liga: 2009–10, 2010–11

CFR Cluj
Liga I: 2011–12

References

External links

 
 
 

1980 births
Living people
People from Santo André, São Paulo
Brazilian footballers
Association football forwards
Campeonato Brasileiro Série A players
Campeonato Brasileiro Série D players
América Futebol Clube (SP) players
Santos FC players
Brasiliense Futebol Clube players
Sport Club do Recife players
Associação Atlética Ponte Preta players
Cruzeiro Esporte Clube players
Criciúma Esporte Clube players
Saudi Professional League players
Al Nassr FC players
Ligue 1 players
FC Sochaux-Montbéliard players
ES Troyes AC players
Primeira Liga players
Liga Portugal 2 players
C.F. Os Belenenses players
S.L. Benfica footballers
S.C. Olhanense players
Liga I players
CFR Cluj players
Chinese Super League players
Changchun Yatai F.C. players
Brazilian expatriate footballers
Expatriate footballers in Saudi Arabia
Expatriate footballers in France
Expatriate footballers in Portugal
Expatriate footballers in Romania
Expatriate footballers in China
Brazilian expatriate sportspeople in France
Brazilian expatriate sportspeople in Portugal
Brazilian expatriate sportspeople in Romania
Brazilian expatriate sportspeople in China
Footballers from São Paulo (state)